Alfons Arts (born 29 August 1965) is a retired Dutch football defender and later manager.

References

1965 births
Living people
Dutch footballers
MVV Maastricht players
PSV Eindhoven players
Go Ahead Eagles players
FC Emmen players
Eredivisie players
Eerste Divisie players
Association football defenders
Dutch football managers
FC Emmen managers
SC Cambuur managers
FC Groningen non-playing staff